Mokole may be,

Mokole language
Mokole language (Benin)
One of the Mokole languages of Guinea and Sierra Leone
Jean-Marie Mokole

See also
Mokele-mbembe